Xantocillin (INN), also known as xanthocillin X or ophthocillin, was the first reported natural product found to contain the isocyanide functional group. It was first isolated from Penicillium notatum by Rothe in 1950 and subsequently from several other sources.

See also
 Questiomycin A
U0126

References 

Isocyanides
Phenols